The City Newton Dragons are a defunct New Zealand rugby league club that was based at Victoria Park, Auckland. The club was created in 1948 by a merger of two original clubs, the City Rovers and Newton Rangers. Both the Rovers and the Rangers participated in the inaugural Auckland Rugby League competition in 1910. In 2004, the club was absorbed by the Ponsonby Ponies, who play a match in the City Newton colours annually to keep the heritage of the club alive.

History

City Rovers

The City Rovers were formed in the days following the formation of the Auckland Rugby League on 19 July 1909. In their first year City played against the Ponsonby Ponies, City included Ernie and Albert Asher, Jim Rukutai and Alex Stanaway.

City won the Auckland Rugby League's first competition, being awarded the Myers Cup in 1910. The Cup had been donated by Arthur Myers.

City again won premierships in 1911, 1916, 1921, 1922, 1923, 1925 and 1944. In 1921 they completed a unique treble by also winning the Roope Rooster and Thacker Shield in the same year.

Newton Rangers

The Newtown Rangers were formed in the days following the formation of the Auckland Rugby League on 19 July 1909. They lost to Ponsonby United 6–16 on 21 August at Victoria Park.

The club won premierships in 1912 and 1927 and they won the Roope Rooster in 1919, 1920 and 1935. In 1927 they won the Stormont Shield defeating Richmond 25-17 in the final.

1948-2004
The City Rovers and Newton Rangers clubs amalgamated to form City Newton in 1948.

During the 1960s the Auckland Rugby League instituted a districts programme and Ellerslie, City Newton and Eastern Suburbs combined to form Eastern Districts. The combination won almost every trophy between 1960 and 1963 before the clubs regained their separate identities.

In 2001 City Newton competed in the Auckland Rugby League's second division, the Sharman Cup.

The City Newton Sports Club Incorporated was struck off as an Incorporated Society on 17 June 2004.

Notable players

The following players played for the New Zealand national rugby league team while with the club;

City Rovers Kiwis
Players who played for New Zealand while playing for City Rovers. In brackets is the year that they first appeared for New Zealand while also playing for Newton.

Albert Asher (1910)
Ernie Asher (1910)
Sid Kean (1911)
Frank Morse (1911) 
Jim Rukutai (1911)
Alex Stanaway (1911) 
Bob Mitchell (1912)
Bill Davidson (1919)
Bert Laing (1919)
Ivan Stewart (1919)
Tom Haddon (1919)
George Paki (1921)
Harry Tancred (1921)
Maurice Wetherill (1924)
Hec McDonald (1924)
Lou Brown (1925)
Ben Davidson (1926)
Stan Clark (1930)
Len Barchard (1930)
Steve Watene (1930)
Hawea Mataira (1939)

Newton Rangers Kiwis
Players who played for New Zealand while playing for Newton Rangers. In brackets is the year that they first appeared for New Zealand while also playing for Newton. Lou Brown (pictured) played for Newton in 1922-23 before transferring to City and then being selected for New Zealand in 1925.

Thomas Houghton (1909)
Arthur Francis (1911)
George A. Gillett (1911)
Billy Curran (1912)
Billy Dervan (1912)
George Cook (1913)
Bill Cloke (1919)
Wally Somers (1919)
Bill Williams (1919)
Craddock Dufty (1919)
George Iles (1919)
Nelson Bass (1919)
Joe Bennett (1920)
Clarrie Polson (1920)
Trevor Hall (1928)
Roy Hardgrave (1928)
Claude Dempsey (1936)
Bill McNeight (1937)

City Newton Kiwis
Ron O'Regan (1983) 
Dean Lonergan 1985

Club Titles

City Rovers grade championships (1910-1944)

 1910 1st Grade (Myers Cup)
 1911 1st Grade (Myers Cup)
 1914 4th Grade
 1915 2nd Grade and 5th Grade
 1916 1st Grade (Myers Cup), 3rd Grade, 4th Grade and 6th Grade
 1917 3rd Grade and 4th Grade
 1918 6th Grade
 1919 4th Grade and 5th Grade
 1920 2nd Grade and 4th Grade
 1921 1st Grade (Monteith Shield) and 5th Grade
 1922 1st Grade (Monteith Shield), 2nd Grade and 6th Grade
 1923 1st Grade (Monteith Shield) and 2nd Grade
 1924 3rd Grade
 1925 1st Grade (Monteith Shield) and 3rd Grade
 1926 6th Grade
 1934 5th Grade
 1936 4th Grade
 1937 6th Grade
 1938 4th Grade
 1939 4th Grade
 1940 4th Grade
 1941 4th Grade
 1944 1st Grade (Fox Memorial Shield)

Other titles

 1916 Roope Rooster
 1918 Roope Rooster
 1921 Roope Rooster
 1924 Roope Rooster
 1939 Phelan Shield
 1942 Rukutai Shield (combined City-Otahuhu side)
 1944 Rukutai Shield
 1944 Stormont Shield

Newton Rangers grade championships (1910-1942)

 1912 First Grade (Myers Cup)
 1921 Second Grade
 1927 First Grade (Monteith Shield)
 1932 Fifth Grade
 1934 Fourth Grade
 1937 Schoolboys (Junior)
 1939 Schoolboys (Senior)
 1940 Schoolboys (Intermediate)

Other titles

 1919 Roope Rooster
 1920 Roope Rooster
 1927 Stormont Shield
 1928 Second grade knockout
 1934 Phelan Shield
 1935 Roope Rooster

Top point scorers (City Rovers and Newton Rangers) 1909-44

City Rovers top point scorers (1909-1944)
The point scoring lists are compiled from matches played in the first grade championship, Roope Rooster, Phelan Shield and Stormont Shield matches which involved all first grade sides. It does not include additional one off type matches such as those against non-Auckland teams or charity matches.

Newton Rangers top point scorers (1909-1944)
The point scoring lists are compiled from matches played in the first grade championship, Roope Rooster, Phelan Shield and Stormont Shield matches which involved all first grade sides. It does not include additional one off type matches such as those against non-Auckland teams or charity matches.

References

City Newton Dragons
City Rovers players
Newton Rangers players
City Newton Dragons players
Rugby clubs established in 1909
Rugby clubs established in 1948
Sports clubs disestablished in 1948
Sports clubs disestablished in 2004
Defunct rugby league teams in New Zealand